The 1988 season of the African Cup Winners' Cup football club tournament was won by CA Bizertin in two-legged final victory against Ranchers Bees. This was the fourteenth season that the tournament took place for the winners of each African country's domestic cup. Thirty-six sides entered the competition, with Dragons de l'Ouémé, Hearts of Oak, Al Madina and KAC Marrakech all withdrawing before the 1st leg of the first round.

Preliminary round

|}

1: Real Republicans won 4-3 PSO
2: First leg abandoned with score at 3-0. Second leg not played.

First round

|}

1: Dragons de l'Ouémé withdrew.
2: Hearts of Oak withdrew.
3: CA Bizerte won 6-5 on PSO.
4: Horseed FC won on away goals.
5: Second leg abandoned with score at 0-0. Inter Club won on away goals.
6: Al-Medina withdrew.
7: KAC Marrakech withdrew.

Second round

|}

Quarter finals

|}
1: Diamant Yaoundé won 5-3 on PSO.
2: Wallidan withdrew.

Semi finals

|}

Final 

|}

External links
 Results available on CAF Official Website
 Results available on RSSSF

African Cup Winners' Cup
2